Robert Coleman Foster I (July 8, 1769 – September 27, 1844) was a prominent Nashville, Tennessee, attorney and politician.

Biography
Foster was born in Virginia on July 8, 1769. He was married to Ann Hubbard. He settled near Bardstown, Kentucky, where his son Ephraim was born in 1794, before moving his family to Nashville in 1797.  He was one of Nashville's earliest residents, and one of the original twelve trustees of Davidson Academy, which eventually became Peabody College, and eventually part of Vanderbilt University.

Foster was elected to the Tennessee General Assembly as a member of Tennessee House of Representatives, serving from 1803 to 1807, including a term as speaker of the House in the 6th General Assembly, from 1805 to 1807. He served in the Tennessee Senate in the 8th, 9th, 10th, and 16th General Assemblies (1809–1815 and 1825–1827) and was elected Speaker of the Senate in 1813 and 1825. He was a candidate for governor in 1815 and 1817, running unsuccessfully against Joseph McMinn.

Foster died on September 27, 1844, and is buried in the Nashville City Cemetery.

Foster's sons Robert Coleman Foster Jr. and Ephraim H. Foster both also served in the Tennessee General Assembly. Ephraim, who was a prominent Nashville attorney and politician, became a United States Senator.

References

Sources
Zollicoffer-Bond, Octavia. (November 14, 1909). "The Foster Family." The Nashville American.

1769 births
1844 deaths
Members of the Tennessee House of Representatives
Speakers of the Tennessee House of Representatives
Tennessee state senators
Tennessee lawyers
People from Nashville, Tennessee
People from Kentucky
19th-century American lawyers